Bright Machines is a software and robotics company whose applications focus on automation for the manufacturing industry. The San Francisco-based company has two primary products. First, Bright Machines employs “micro-factories” made up of robot cells for the purpose of automating electronics manufacturing and inspection. Second, Bright Machines offers software tools for the purpose of improving efficiencies in the manufacturing process.

History
Bright Machines was founded on May 25, 2018 as a spin-off of Flex Ltd. Initially the company began as stealth startup under the name AutoLabs AI. Amar Hanspal, former co-CEO at Autodesk, was named CEO. Its board of directors are Stephen Luczo, executive chairman of Seagate; and Lior Susan, founder of Eclipse Ventures. In August 2021, the company named Michael Keogh its new chief financial officer, and in December 2021, the company announced that Lior Susan had been appointed interim CEO.

In October 23, 2018, the company officially changed its name to Bright Machines and announced it raised $179 million for its Series A. The $179 million funding round was led by Eclipse, with participation from Flex. Other investors include BMW i Ventures and Lux Capital.

In May 2021, Bright Machines announced plans for an initial public offering through a SPAC merger with SCVX Corp, which valued the company at $1.6 billion and was expected to generate approximately $435 million in cash. On December 13, 2021, the company announced that it was terminating the SPAC agreement, citing "market conditions." On October 31, 2022, the company announced a $100 million Series B funding round, led by Eclipse Ventures, along with $32 million in debut financing, led by Silicon Valley Bank and Hercules Capital, bringing its total amount raised to $330 million, and valuing the company at $938 million.

Products
Bright Machines makes software and robotic modules that assemble small goods, such as household appliances, tools, and electronics. The modules can be plugged together to create a small assembly line, and the robots can be programmed through the company's software to follow instructions.

References

2018 establishments in California
Companies based in San Francisco
Corporate spin-offs
Software companies based in the San Francisco Bay Area
Software companies established in 2018
Manufacturing companies established in 2018
American companies established in 2018
Software companies of the United States
Robotics companies of the United States